The Gordie Howe International Bridge, known during development as the Detroit River International Crossing and the New International Trade Crossing, is a cable-stayed international bridge across the Detroit River, currently under construction. The crossing will connect Detroit and Windsor by linking Interstate 75, Interstate 94 and Interstate 96 in Michigan with Highway 401 in Ontario (through the Rt. Hon. Herb Gray Parkway extension of Highway 401). The bridge will provide uninterrupted freeway traffic flow, as opposed to the current configuration with the nearby Ambassador Bridge that connects to city streets on the Ontario side. The bridge is named after Canadian ice hockey player Gordie Howe, whose celebrated career included 25 years with the Detroit Red Wings, and who died two years before construction began.

First proposed in 2004, the project was met with prominent opposition by Ambassador Bridge owner Manuel Moroun, who believed competition from a publicly owned bridge would reduce his revenue. A Canadian federal Crown corporation, the Windsor–Detroit Bridge Authority, was established in 2012 to coordinate the bridge's construction and management. The project was approved by the United States government in April 2013. The following month, the Canadian government allocated  million to begin land acquisition on the Detroit side.

Preparing the site for construction on both sides of the river cost over  million. In May 2018, the Michigan Court of Appeals ruled against Moroun's attempt to stop expropriations on the Michigan side of the river. The "Bridging North America" consortium was selected in July 2018 to build the bridge, and construction began that month. Construction is expected to be completed in 2024.

History

The project began as the Detroit River International Crossing (DRIC) in 2004, and received approvals in 2007 and 2008 with Ontario beginning Windsor–Essex Parkway construction in 2011. The highway, renamed the Rt. Hon. Herb Gray Parkway in December 2012, was completed in November 2015, although the replacement of several girders delayed the parkway's completion. The delay did not affect the bridge project's timetable.

In 2011, the bridge was tentatively scheduled for completion in 2016, according to the Michigan Department of Transportation. It was estimated the bridge would generate $70.4 million in toll revenues in its first year of operation. The Michigan Senate's Economic Development Committee dealt the plan a setback by turning down a $550 million Canadian appropriation in October 2011, but an agreement announced June 15, 2012, ensured the project will proceed with the Canadian federal government funding bridge construction, land acquisition in Michigan and the construction of Interstate 75 on-ramps. The Canadian contribution will be repaid from bridge tolls collected on the Canadian side, and no tolls will be charged on the U.S. side.

On April 12, 2013, the US Department of State and the Obama Administration granted Michigan the permit required to build the bridge, allowing construction to go forward once details were finalized.

The Canadian government allocated $25 million to begin land acquisition on the Detroit side on May 22, 2013. A Windsor–Detroit Bridge Authority (WDBA), with three representatives from each side, was appointed July 30, 2014. In January 2015, Parsons Corporation was named the general engineering consultant for the bridge. On February 18, 2015, Minister of Transport Lisa Raitt announced Canada would fund the construction of a customs plaza on the U.S. side of the bridge in Detroit's Delray neighborhood. The plaza will have a budget of around $250 million, and be recouped through tolls. The U.S. Department of Homeland Security will provide a first-year investment of $150 million, and an "ongoing annual requirement" of $50 million, to cover the plaza's operational and staffing costs.

The Herb Gray Parkway was completed in November 2015.

In July 2016, it was announced many properties that would be required to build the bridge were still in the hands of private landowners. An estimated 30 of the 900 properties needed were considered to be problems if the owners resist selling. Dwight Duncan, the former finance minister for Ontario, is the interim chair of the Windsor–Detroit Bridge Authority developing the project. In July 2016, the CBC reported Duncan had advised the Government of Canada to consider buying the Ambassador Bridge from Moroun.

In a joint statement released after a meeting between newly elected U.S. president Donald Trump and Canadian prime minister Justin Trudeau on February 13, 2017, the two governments reiterated the support of the "expeditious completion" of the project. Construction started in 2018 after a project contractor was selected in 2017. This is listed as a priority infrastructure project by the Donald Trump administration.

In June 2017, the City of Detroit sold 36 city-owned parcels of land, underground assets and five miles of city-owned streets in the Delray neighborhood, which is the site of the U.S. Customs facility. A $33 million neighborhood improvement fund for the neighborhood was set up. Residents of the area can stay and have their home renovated or move to a renovated home in a different neighborhood. Moroun filed a lawsuit to try to stop the expropriations, but in May 2018, the Michigan Court of Appeal ruled against him.

On July 5, 2018, it was announced the consortium "Bridging North America" had been named as the project's builder. The consortium consisted of AECOM for design; Dragados Canada, Fluor Corporation, and Aecon for construction; and ACS Infrastructure, Fluor, and Aecon for "Operations and maintenance of the bridge and two Ports of Entry". On September 28, 2018, the WDBA announced the project would cost CA$3.8 billion and would be completed by the end of 2024.

Design
The bridge design is by chief bridge architect of AECOM, Erik Behrens. It will have two "A"-shaped towers built on the banks of the Detroit River, six lanes for automotive traffic, and a bicycle and walking path.

With traffic crossing the border expected to grow from 18,500 vehicles a day in 2016 to 26,500 by 2025, the Gordie Howe International Bridge will provide an orderly flow of people and goods between the two countries. Transport Canada retained the engineering firms, Morrison Hershfield, Davis Langdon, and Delcan to develop cost estimates for right of way and utility relocation; design and construction; and operation and maintenance on the Canadian side of the crossing.

The bridge will connect to an extension of Highway 401, locally named the Rt. Hon. Herb Gray Parkway, on its east side. The parkway is below-grade and has six through-lanes. From there, it turns northwest and follows a new alignment to the border.
Initial construction of a noise barrier from North Talbot Road to Howard Avenue began in March 2010. Two new bridges south of the Highway 3/401 junction were also constructed.
Full construction of the parkway began in 2011, and was completed in November 2015.

Construction of the Rt. Hon. Herb Gray Parkway that links to the bridge on the Canadian side was hampered by concerns it could affect Ontario's last known habitat of Butler's garter snakes. During the construction process, biologists relocated the snakes (including eastern fox snakes, and the garters—of which there were a larger number than originally alleged), with their new habitats protected by a specially-designed above and below-ground fencing system along affected portions of the E. C. Row Expressway.

Legislation
In 2010, the Michigan Senate had not approved any authorizing legislation related to the bridge. The Senate Majority Leader Mike Bishop had stated that the Senate would not vote until revenue forecasts were released, reports that were being withheld by the director of the Michigan Department of Transportation. The Michigan House of Representatives had already passed the measure while the bill was called "doomed" in the Senate. In 2009, the Ohio State Senate passed a non-binding resolution expressing support for the crossing, and urged the Michigan government to pass it, due to Canada being Ohio's largest foreign trade partner, with US$35.8 billion per year in goods traded between Ohio and Canada.

Michigan Governor Rick Snyder supported construction of the new crossing in his first State of the State address on January 19, 2011. His plan would leverage Canadian money to receive a 160 percent match—totaling $2.2 billion—on funding from the Federal Highway Administration in a deal reached the week previous to the speech. In August 2011, Michigan State Senator Mike Kowall, when asked by the Windsor Star if enabling legislation for the bridge would currently pass, replied "absolutely not."

In October 2011, "the Michigan Senate rejected a bill [that] would have allowed the state to accept $550 million from the Canadian government to fund the country's share of the New International Trade Crossing." One commentator, Bill Mann, noted the rejection, saying "Canada calls the new bridge its biggest infrastructure priority and has even offered to pay for the span. But pesky U.S. special-interest politics intrude once again," as he reviewed a number of "U.S. government actions (and inactions) that show little concern about Canadian concerns". Mann drew from a Maclean's article sub-titled "We used to be friends" about U.S.–Canada relations after the Keystone Pipeline, the bridge, and other "insulting" decisions.

Opposition
The most vocal opposition to the new crossing came from American billionaire Manuel "Matty" Moroun (1927–2020), owner of the nearby Ambassador Bridge. He sued the governments of Canada and Michigan to stop its construction, and released a proposal to build a second span of the Ambassador Bridge (which he would have owned) instead. Critics suggest that Moroun's opposition was fueled by the prospect of lost profits from duty-free gasoline sales, which are exempt from about 60 cents per gallon in taxes even though the pump price to consumers is only a few cents lower.

In early June 2011, the conservative group Americans for Prosperity posted bogus eviction notices on homes in Detroit's Delray district. With the words "Eviction Notice" in large type, the notices told homeowners their properties could be taken by the Michigan Department of Transportation to make way for the proposed new bridge. The group's state director said the fake notices were intended to get residents to contact state lawmakers, to ask them to vote against the bridge project.

In 2012, Moroun spent more than  promoting a proposed amendment to the Michigan Constitution that, had it passed, would have required approval of both the voters of Detroit and the voters of Michigan in statewide elections to build the bridge. NPR station Michigan Radio aired a story on November 2, four days before the vote, which indicated the amendment's "seemingly neutral language masks a very specific—and bitter—political battle". The ballot proposal was defeated by a 60 percent to 40 percent margin, paving the way for the project to proceed.

In July 2011, the Canadian Transit Company, the Canadian side of Moroun ownership of the Ambassador Bridge, began running advertisements against the DRIC proposal, calling it a "$2.2 billion road to nowhere". The phone number listed for Canadian Transit Company forwarded to a phone number in Michigan, and the Canadian Transit Company previously held its 2011 annual meeting at the offices of the Detroit International Bridge Company. MPP Dwight Duncan advised that he was investigating whether or not the ads violated Ontario's election laws, which disallow public spending by foreign lobbyists. In 2018, the company aired television ads on Fox & Friends asking President Donald Trump to cancel the project. In late 2019, Trump signed the first U.S. funding for customs and border protection for bridge into law.

Naming
Snyder stated that he had "not [been] crazy" about naming the bridge the Detroit River International Crossing, noting that "DRIC" was intended only to be the name of the commission sponsoring the bridge, and not the bridge itself. Concerns were also acknowledged that the abbreviated name was too close to that of the Detroit International Bridge Company (DIBC)—that would be too sensitive given its objections to the project. Sometime afterward, the working name for the project became the New International Trade Crossing (NITC), garnering the endorsement of 139 organizations and individuals. It was under the NITC name that the project was approved by the U.S. State Department on April 12, 2013.

In late 2010, David Bradley, president of the Ontario Trucking Association, proposed naming the bridge in honor of Canadian professional ice hockey player Gordie Howe, who played the bulk of his career for the Detroit Red Wings. The naming was supported by a number of Canadian politicians, along with Howe's son Marty—who felt the name would have been symbolic of him having come from Canada to spend his NHL career in Detroit. On May 14, 2015, during an event attended by then-Canadian Prime Minister Stephen Harper, it was officially announced that the bridge would be known as the Gordie Howe International Bridge. Howe, 87 and in ailing health, did not attend the ceremony. Later, when asked by his son what he thought about the naming, Howe remarked "That sounds pretty good to me." Howe died one year later on June 10, 2016.

See also

Ambassador Bridge, the existing suspension bridge international crossing, opened in 1929
Detroit–Windsor Tunnel, a car-van-bus link between the two cities
Blue Water Bridge, connecting Port Huron, Michigan, to Sarnia, Ontario
Infrastructure policy of Donald Trump
List of bridges in Canada

References

External links
Windsor-Detroit Bridge Authority (WDBA) official website
Detroit River International Crossing Project
Herb Gray Parkway official website
Conceptual Engineering Report
New International Trade Crossing from the State of Michigan
Video of the Highway 401 extension that will connect to the Gordie Howe Bridge

Bridges in Detroit
Transport in Windsor, Ontario
Canada–United States bridges
Bridges under construction
Detroit River
Road bridges in Michigan
Road bridges in Ontario
Buildings and structures in Windsor, Ontario
Toll bridges in Michigan
Toll bridges in Canada
Public–private partnership projects in Canada
Cable-stayed bridges in Canada
Cable-stayed bridges in the United States